Man in Demand on All Sides (Pán na roztrhání) is a 1934 Czechoslovak film, directed by Miroslav Cikán. It stars  Ljuba Hermanová, Věra Ferbasová, and Lída Baarová.

Cast
Ljuba Hermanová as Rita
Věra Ferbasová as Slávka
Lída Baarová as Eva Svobová
František Černý 		
František Smolík as Karel Svarc
Jan W. Speerger 		
Nora Stallich 		
Václav Trégl as Komorník Filip
Josef Zezulka as Assistant in the Avion Factory

References

External links
Man in Demand on All Sides (Pán na roztrhání) at the Internet Movie Database

1934 films
Films directed by Miroslav Cikán
Czech comedy films
Czechoslovak black-and-white films
1930s Czech films
Czechoslovak comedy films